Yahya Syed is a retired commodore of Bangladesh Navy and former Managing Director of Bangladesh Shipping Corporation.

Early life
Syed joined Bangladesh Navy in 1981. He received training at the Britannia Royal Naval College. He was commissioned in 1983 in Bangladesh Navy. He received further specialized training on Signal Communication in Pakistan. He carried out further studies at the Asia-Pacific Center for Security Studies in Hawaii and École Militaire in Paris. He is an alumnus of National Defence College and Preston University in Wyoming.

Career
Syed commanded a frigate of Bangladesh Navy and was the commanding officer BNS Shaheed Moazzem. He served as the Deputy Commandant of the Defence Services Command and Staff College. He served as the Chief Military Personnel Officer of the United Nations–African Union Mission in Darfur. He was the Military Liaison Officer of United Nations Operation in Côte d'Ivoire. On 6 April 2017, he was appointed Managing Director of Bangladesh Shipping Corporation. During his term as Managing Director, he added 26 ships to Bangladesh Shipping Corporation. He was the Deputy Director (Second in Command) of Bangladesh Coast Guard.

References

Bangladesh Navy personnel
Living people
Year of birth missing (living people)
National Defence College (Bangladesh) alumni
Graduates of Britannia Royal Naval College